“Homecoming” is the pilot episode of the ABC television series Miss Guided. It was the series premiere of the show, and was written by Caroline Williams and directed by Todd Holland It aired March 18, 2008.

Cast

Guest starring
Tim Bagley - Peter
Daryl Sabara - Russell
Chad Broskey - Shane
Chelsea Harris - Allison

Co-Starring
Vanessa Marano - Kelly
Juan Carlos Cantunatio - the Janitor
Tom Choi - Ed the Wheelchair Man
Jane Galloway Heitz - the Lunch Lady

Episode summary
Opening on a sunny high school, birds chrip, flags fly, and school mascots fight. A blonde woman arrives to end Andrew (the mascot)'s fight. The woman is Becky Freeley, the school's guidance counselor. Becky cheerfully intones that she knows exactly how difficult high school can be. She meets with kids like Russell – who's failing remedial PE and may or may not have head lice. But she claims to love the kids, and that they love her back. She strolls past a group of African Americans, cluelessly spouting, "What's the haps, peeps?" She later swipes a Danish from a chunky girl, saying that it may fill the hole in her mouth, but "not the hole in her soul".

Chris "Bruce" Parnell, the school's vice principal, scuttles up to Becky. He is insulted because Becky's been made chair of the Homecoming dance.  When Bruce is in charge, dances are held at 10:00 A.M. on Wednesdays. Bruce is pretty sure that if she doesn't crack down, the school dance is going to turn into a scene from 28 Days Later. As he tries to convince her to hire security, Becky comes to a dead stop. She spots Tim, a male teacher who helps an old lady pick up dropped books, and it is shown Becky loves Tim. Becky shakes herself and tells Bruce that she's got chaperones. Namely, Tim. Becky figures that the next logical step is for Tim to ask her to be his date to the dance. The competition doesn't stand a chance, especially since it consists of Miss Kinney (a woman with a lesbian attire) Miss Fukui (grim-looking Trunchbull type) and the Lunch Lady (all jowls in a stylish ensemble of Halloween sweater and hairnet). Bruce smirks that he'll be waiting in the wings for Becky's dance to fail. Becky remembers how when she was in high school, she wasn't as beautiful as she is now. She had fanny packs, headgear, frizzy hair, and chest-high acid-washed jeans. Becky admits she wasn't exactly popular, but she had many interests and friends. She hung out with a kid in a wheelchair who "felt sorry for her and thought she might put out." Becky thinks the principal offered her this job because of her qualifications. However, it's shown he really hired her because of her new looks. However, Becky's former classmate, Lisa Germain, is also teaching at the school as an English teacher. Lisa, like Becky (if not, more) is stunning, and happened to be the most popular girl in Becky's graduating class. Lisa only remembers Becky as "that girl who vomited during the safe sex assembly." It's shown the two are not on good terms, starting a rivalry.

Becky talks to Shane, a student insecure about the dance. Becky recalls her own homecoming, which was a disaster as her date never showed up. Shane wants advice about asking a girl to the dance. He doesn't want to make a fool of himself. It is now shown Becky's awkwardness extends into her counseling sessions. Becky begins breakdancing around her office to the tune of "Push It". When she's done, she asks if the "advice" was helpful. Shane demurs, saying that this woman is older than anyone he's ever dated. As he speaks, he's shyly fingering the name plaque on her desk. So of course, Becky thinks he's talking about her. The bell rings, sparing him the embarrassment of her turning him down. However, he really is crushing on someone else. In the teacher's lounge, Becky embarrasses herself in front of Tim. Tim is worried about being taken seriously as a teacher. He replaced the old Spanish teacher, who was fired after his hard drive was seized by the FBI. Tim, who used to be the Auto Shop teacher, took the job because he wanted to be more than a grease monkey. Plus, there was nobody else (they offered the job to the janitor, but he didn't want anybody poking around on his hard drive). Now Tim's just one Spanish lesson ahead of the very students he's teaching. Becky tells him that a student has a crush on her, but it wouldn't be right for her to go to the dance with him. Going with another faculty member, though, would be alright. Lisa Germain flirtatiously introduces herself to Tim, embarrasses Becky by talking about her orthodontia issues in high school, then strikes up a way-too-easy conversation with Becky's man.

In her office, Becky is furious when the principal arrives and asks her to be his date. Fortunately, Becky is saved by the arrival of a student. Later, the preparations for the dance are almost complete, but Tim hasn't asked her. She would advise a female student in this situation to ask him herself, but she'd never do that, because she thinks it would make her look desperate. The next morning, Tim casually rolls into the staff parking lot. Becky, following him, offers to share homemade enchiladas for lunch and talk about the dance. He agrees, but just then Lisa drives into the lot in a classic convertible. Tim admires the car, which promptly breaks down. The scene changes to the nurse fixing Becky's show after she helped Tim push Lisa's disabled palm. Bruce arrives to insist that she use his security detail for the dance, and Becky relents. It's shown in high school that Bruce was the one bullies would bully. Becky's shrieking Tim's name banshee-style down the school hallway at lunchtime. He bails on their enchilada date because he has to study for a parent teacher conference. Becky's eating the enchiladas on her own when Shane comes in. She tells him that certain feelings may develop in therapeutic situations. A confused Shane clarifies that he wants to ask out a girl named Allison, who's a senior. He also reveals a friend of his asked Lisa out to the dance, but found out Lisa was going with Tim. A flashback shows it may be because of Todd Collins all over again – Lisa's high school boyfriend, whom Becky liked. Later, Tim apologizes for missing lunch. Turns out that Lisa's the one who asked him to the dance.  He doesn't look particularly excited about it. Becky sighs that she'll see him at the dance, and even manages to make a wistful little joke about somebody having a baby in the bathroom.

Becky gets dropped off by her mom, who has a date and needs to borrow the car. Rather than going inside, Becky decides to crawl GI Jane-style through the bushes to peer through the gym windows and spy on Lisa and Tim. Everything's peachy until she looks over, and discovers it's Russell, the boy with head lice. Becky finally gives him decent advice: everyone has to grow up at their own pace. Russell thanks her, then asks, if he can touch her breast, to which she calmly replies "No sweetie". With leaves from the bushes sticking out of her hair, Becky says some people think she doesn't have time for a life of her own. But now that her dad has run off, her mom needs her. Becky gets offered a ride home by the nerdish girl whose outfit matches hers. But just then she sees Lisa and Tim coming out of the gym. Becky runs away, trips, and falls spectacularly down behind a parked car. There, she crouches and hides as Lisa and Tim talk nearby. Lisa cries about how hard it is for her to be single, but Tim says she's not alone – he and Becky are single, too.  Lisa laughs that Becky's desperation is kind of pathetic. Tim proves that he's a truly awesome guy by saying he knows she can be awkward at times, but that's why he's so impressed. Becky's always so positive. The next day, Bruce is his usual snappish self about Becky's absence at the dance. She tells him she was there, helping out Russell. She dreamily looks out the window and, seeing Tim walking up to the school, sighs that she loves her job. It's like her car. Her whole life she wanted that car, and now she can't believe she's so lucky. Right about then, a taxi backs into said car in the parking lot. Becky takes a sip of tea, trying to suppress the nervous twitch I think she may be developing.

Cultural references
Becky dances to the tune of Push It by Salt N Pepa.
Becky and Ed the Wheelchair Man are the sole members of their Highschool Milli Vanilli club.

Critical reception
The show received a 63 out of 100 on Metacritic, indicating "generally favorable reviews", with the most positive review from Entertainment Weekly saying "MG is wonderfully absurd and the supporting cast is satisfyingly straight-faced" [21 Mar 2008, p. 53] while the most negative review from Variety, which said "Beyond Greer's latter-day Mary Tyler Moore shtick, there's not a note or character that doesn't feel warmed over."

Title reference
The title of the episode references many series titles which have "Homecoming".

References

2008 American television episodes
American television series premieres